Pull is the third studio album by American rock band Winger. The album was released in 1993 by Atlantic Records.

It was produced by Mike Shipley on a considerable budget and marked a significant change in Winger's sound, eschewing their glam metal anthems prevalent in their first two albums for a harder and more aggressive style of music with a good dose of socio-political leanings on tracks like "Blind Revolution Mad", "In for the Kill" and "Who's the One". The material was also less commercial and radio-friendly, evident especially in the track "Junkyard Dog (Tears on Stone)" incorporating contemporary heavy metal and progressive elements and clocking in at 6:54.

The album is often regarded as the favourite among the group's fans, but in terms of sales figures the album was not as successful as the two first albums, peaking at #83 on Billboard's Album chart. However, the lead single "Down Incognito" reached #15 on the Mainstream rock Billboard chart.

Pull was recorded by Winger as a trio, as guitarist/keyboardist Paul Taylor left the band after the In the Heart of the Young tour in 1992.

A bonus track called "Hell to Pay" was available on the Japanese version of the album. This track is also included on the 2001 compilation The Very Best of Winger.

Track listing

Personnel

Band members
 Kip Winger – vocals, bass, acoustic guitars, keyboards
 Reb Beach – guitars, backing vocals
 Rod Morgenstein – drums, percussion, backing vocals

Additional musicians
 Frank Latorre – harmonica on "Down Incognito"
 Alex Acuña – percussion on "Like A Ritual" and "Who's the One"

Album credits 
 Produced by Mike Shipley
 Co-produced by Kip Winger
 Recorded and mixed by Mike Shipley
 Assisted by Mike Stock
 Mastered by Ted Jensen at Sterling Sound, New York
 Recorded and mixed at "Secret Sound - South Pacific"

The Making of Pull 
The Making of Pull was a VHS video released by Winger in 1993. It features home movie footage of the band in the studio recording the album Pull, plus promo videos for the following songs:

 "Down Incognito"
 "Spell I'm Under"
 "In My Veins"
 "Who's the One"

1993 albums
Atlantic Records albums
Winger (band) albums
Albums produced by Mike Shipley